l'Unità (lit. 'the Unity') was an Italian newspaper, founded as the official newspaper of the Italian Communist Party (PCI) in 1924. It was supportive of that party's successor parties, the Democratic Party of the Left, Democrats of the Left, and, from October 2007 until its closure, the Democratic Party. The newspaper closed on 31 July 2014. It was restarted on 30 June 2015, but it ceased again on 3 June 2017.

History and profile 
l'Unità was founded by Antonio Gramsci on 12 February 1924 as the "newspaper of workers and peasants", the official newspaper of the Italian Communist Party (PCI). The paper was printed in Milan with a circulation of 20,000 to 30,000. On 8 November 1925, publications were blocked by the city's prefect together with Avanti!, the newspaper of the Italian Socialist Party (PSI). After an assassination attempt on Benito Mussolini (31 October 1926), its publication was completely suppressed. A clandestine edition was resumed on the first day of 1927 with irregular circulation in Milan, Turin, Rome and in France. Full publication was resumed after the Allied conquest of Rome on 6 June 1944, the new editor-in-chief being Celeste Negarville.

After the liberation from the German occupation in 1945, new local editions began in Milan, Genoa and Turin, the latter edited by philosopher Ludovico Geymonat. Elio Vittorini became the editor-in-chief of l'Unità during this period. The newspaper's contributors included Davide Layolo, Luigi Cavallo, Ada Gobetti, Cesare Pavese, Italo Calvino, Alfonso Gatto, Aldo Tortorella and Paolo Spriano. In the same year, the festa de l'Unità was launched in most Italian cities. In 1957, the Genoese, Milanese and Torinese editions were merged into a single edition for northern Italy.

The newspaper's editorships were unified in 1962 under Mario Alicata, who was succeeded by Maurizio Ferrara in 1966. In 1974, daily circulation of l'Unità amounted to 239,000 copies, but in the early 1980s this number was to fall substantially, mostly due to competition from the new left-oriented la Repubblica: the 100 million copies sold in 1981 decreased by two-fifths in just one year alone, to 60 million in 1982. It was also in 1982 that a document was published by the newspaper which accused the Christian Democratic minister Vincenzo Scotti of collaborating with the Camorra leader Raffaele Cutolo, a claim that was subsequently proved to be false. The editor-in-chief Claudio Petruccioli resigned and was replaced by Emanuele Macaluso. Massimo D'Alema, the future Prime Minister of Italy, was managing-director until July 1990.

From 1989 to 1990, the newspaper was accompanied by the satirical weekly magazine Cuore, directed by Michele Serra. In 1991, the title changed from Journal of the Italian Communist Party to Journal founded by Antonio Gramsci. From 1992 to 1996, its director was Walter Veltroni, who started periodically providing free gifts, such as books and videocassettes, with copies of the newspaper.

The newspaper ceased publication for eight months from 28 July 2000 to 28 March 2001 because of financial problems. Following this uncertain period, it was published by Baldini & Castoldi, a company not linked to the Democrats of the Left (DS) or Democratic Party (PD); however, its political position continued to be strongly tied to the DS and PD.

In May 2008, Tiscali founder and Sardinia president Renato Soru finalized a deal to become the new newspaper owner. One of the first moves made by the new property was the appointment of former la Repubblica journalist Concita De Gregorio as new editor-in-chief in August 2008, replacing Antonio Padellaro in the post. In June 2009, Maurizio Mian's Gunther Reform Holding invested €3m to acquire a 20% stake in l'Unità, still under the ownership of Soru. On 7 May 2012, the paper began to be published in Berliner format.

l'Unita again suspended publication on 31 July 2014. A meeting of shareholders was unable to decide how to keep the newspaper financially viable as debts amounted to €30 million.

Circulation 
The 1988 circulation of l'Unita was 300,000 copies. In 1991, the paper had a circulation of circa 156,000 copies, but next year its circulation was 124,000 copies. In 1997, it was the tenth best-selling Italian newspaper with a circulation of 82,078 copies. The circulation of the paper was 49,536 copies in 2008 and 53,221 copies in 2009. It fell to 44,450 copies in 2010. In April 2014, the paper had a circulation of 20,937 copies.

Editors-in-chief 

 Ottavio Pastore (1924)
 Alfonso Leonetti (1924–1925)
 Mario Malatesta (1925)
 Riccardo Ravagnan (1925–1926)
 Girolamo Li Causi (1926)
 Eugenio Curiel (1943–1944)
 Celeste Negarville (1944–1945)
 Velio Spano (1945–1946)
 Mario Montagnana (1946–1947)
 Pietro Ingrao (1947–1957)
 Alfredo Reichlin (1957–1962)
 Mario Alicata (1962–1966)
 Maurizio Ferrara (1966)
 Maurizio Ferrara & Elio Quercioli (1966–1969)
 Giancarlo Pajetta (1969–1970)
 Aldo Tortorella (1970–1975)
 Luca Pavolini (1975–1977)
 Alfredo Reichlin (1977–1981)
 Claudio Petruccioli (1981–1982)
 Emanuele Macaluso (1982–1986)
 Gerardo Chiaromonte (1986–1988)
 Massimo D'Alema (1988–1990)
 Renzo Foa (1990–1992)
 Walter Veltroni (1992–1996)
 Giuseppe Caldarola (1996–1998)
 Mino Fuccillo (1998)
 Paolo Gambescia (1998–1999)
 Giuseppe Caldarola (1999–2000)
 Furio Colombo (2001–2004)
 Antonio Padellaro (2004–2008)
 Concita De Gregorio (2008–2011)
 Claudio Sardo (2011–2013)
 Luca Landò (2013–2014)
 Erasmo D'Angelis (2015–2016)
 Sergio Staino & Andrea Romano (2016–2017)
 Sergio Staino (2017)
 Marco Bucciantini (2017)

References

External links
Historical digital archive, from 2 January 1946 to 31 July 2014

1924 establishments in Italy
2014 disestablishments in Italy
Antonio Gramsci
Communist newspapers
Daily newspapers published in Italy
Defunct newspapers published in Italy
Italian-language newspapers
Newspapers established in 1924
Newspapers published in Rome
Publications disestablished in 2014
Socialist newspapers